George Gale House may refer to:

George Gale House (Cambridge, Massachusetts), Middlesex County
George Gale House (Worcester, Massachusetts), Worcester County